Lepturges sejunctimacula is a species of beetle in the family Cerambycidae. It was described by Bates in 1881.

References

Lepturges
Beetles described in 1881